Eduardo Franco Zannier (15 March 1945, in Paysandú,  Uruguay – 1 February 1989, in Ib.) was a singer and Uruguayan composer who gained international fame as the vocalist of the melodic group Los Iracundos.

Biography 
With Los Iracundos, Franco rose to international acclaim around the mid 60s, with juvenile romantic subjects such as «Calla», «Todo erminó», «El desengaño», «La lluvia terminó», «Felicidad, felicidad», «El triunfador», «Puerto Montt»  and «Es la lluvia que cae»,; included subject in the album Los Iracundos en Roma-the most successful of this decade- successes that carry them to incursionar, even, in the cinema, in several opportunities like invited and in one of them like protagonists, in the film Este loco verano where besides interpreted the songs of his repertoire and Locos por la musica.

On 1 February 1989, Eduardo Franco died of a terminal cancer to the lymphatic ganglions in his hometown, after several years of enduring in front of his demanded profession; leaving like successor to Jorge Julio Gatto Bell.

Discography 
Here it finds  the discography that recorded with his grouping:
1963: Stop 
1964: Sin palabras 
1964: Con palabras
1965: Primeros en América
1966: El Sonido de Los Iracundos
1966: Los Iracundos en Roma
1967: La juventud
1967: En Estereofonía
1967 : Felicidad, Felicidad
1968: Puerto Montt
1969: La lluvia terminó
1969: La Música de Los Iracundos 
1970: Los Iracundos
1971: Impactos
1971: Instrumental
1972: Agua con amor
1973: Te lo pido de rodillas
1974: Tango joven
1974: Y te has quedado sola
1975: Cada noche mía
1976: Cómo pretendes que te quiera
1977: Gol! de Los Iracundos
1978: Pasión y vida 
1979: Amor y fe 
1980: Incomparables 
1981: Fue tormenta de verano 
1982: 40 grados
1983: Apróntate a vivir
1984: Tú con él
1985: Iracundos '86
1986: 20 Grandes 20
1987: La Historia de Los iracundos

References 

20th-century Uruguayan male singers
Uruguayan composers
Male composers
1989 deaths
Deaths from cancer in Uruguay
Uruguayan musicians
1945 births
People from Paysandú